Trent Viaducts are two adjacent parallel railway bridges which carry the Midland Main Line over the River Trent between Derbyshire and Nottinghamshire. 

Originally a single bridge, it was built by the engineer Charles Blacker Vignoles for the Midland Counties Railway in 1839. 

The Viaduct was rebuilt between 1891 and 1893 when a second crossing was added by the Midland Railway to carry the high-level goods line from Toton. The rebuilding included the removal of the cast iron spans supplied by the Butterley Company.

On the Midland Railway System Maps of 1918, the bridges are identified as bridges 27 and 27a.

Just south of the viaducts are twin tunnels through Red Hill.

References

Railway viaducts in Derbyshire
Railway viaducts in Nottinghamshire
Bridges across the River Trent
Bridges completed in 1839